Kelly McLoughlin is a former association footballer who represented New Zealand at international level.

McLoughlin made a solitary official international appearance for New Zealand in a 3–0 win over Singapore on 21 February 1995.

References

Living people
New Zealand association footballers
New Zealand international footballers
Year of birth missing (living people)
Place of birth missing (living people)
Association football defenders